Resende Municipality may refer to:
Resende Municipality, Portugal
Resende, Rio de Janeiro (municipality)
Municipality name disambiguation pages